Fender California Series electric guitars were produced by Fender in 1997 and 1998. The guitars were carved in California, shipped to Baja California Norte, Ensenada, Mexico for painting, then assembled in California.

General features 
 Vintage style “C” profile neck with a 9½" radius.
 21 medium jumbo frets.
 Vintage tremolo, tuners and 4 bolt neck plate made on same machines as 1950's Fender guitars 
 3 Ply WBW pickguard.
 25½" scale length.

Technical Information 
The Fender California Series Stratocaster guitars have USA vintage style tremolos and tuners and other hardware.The tremolo bridge spacing is the same as the Fender USA vintage bridge spacing of 2 3/16". The Fender California Series Stratocaster bodies are routed for a single neck/single middle/bridge humbucking pickup configuration and have a polyurethane paint finish. The pickup configuration could also be routed for a single neck/ single middle/single bridge. They do not have the infamous "swimming pool" rout. The single coil pickups used on this Stratocaster model are Fender pickups, in the usual 3-single coil arrangement, or the 2-single coil and 1-humbucker in the bridge position ("Fat Strat") arrangement.

The California Series Telecaster model also features vintage hardware such as Kluson-style tuners and a vintage bridge with six individual steel saddles. Medium jumbo frets make string bending and playability by far easier in contrast to the usual thin vintage frets. All Telecaster bodies of this particular series were routed for a humbucker pickup in the neck position. There were two options of the pickup configuration: Either a "Fat Tele" pickup arrangement with a Fender USA humbucker neck pickup and a  bridge pickup or a Stratocaster single coil pickup in the neck position combined with a  single coil bridge pickup. The serial numbers are in an AMXN + 6 digits format while the first digit represents the year of production. AMXN7***** means the guitar was manufactured in 1997.

All Fender California Series have "Made in USA" on the headstock.

References 
AMxn710968

External links 
Mr Gearhead Fender Manuals.
 Press Release.
Vintage Guitar Magazine 

California Series (USA)
1997 musical instruments